"Fingertips '93", is a song by Swedish pop duo Roxette, released as the third and final single from their fourth studio album Tourism on 26 January 1993. The single was only released in a select few countries, and charted moderately in territories such as Belgium, Germany, the Netherlands, Sweden and Spain. The song would be given a wider release when it was issued as one of the b-sides on the duo's proceeding single, "Almost Unreal", which was released four months later in May 1993.

Music video
The music video was Roxette's first collaboration with director Jonas Åkerlund, who would go on to direct a total of twelve music videos for the duo.

Formats and track listings
All music and lyrics by Per Gessle, except "Hotblooded", music by Marie Fredriksson and Gessle.

 7" single and cassette (Europe 8650237)
 "Fingertips '93" – 3:42
 "Dressed for Success" (Live from the Sydney Entertainment Centre on 13 December 1991) – 4:49

 CD single (Australia · Europe 8650222)
 "Fingertips '93" – 3:42
 "Dressed for Success" (Live from Sydney) – 4:49
"Hotblooded" (Live from Sydney) – 3:55
"The Voice" – 4:27

Personnel
Credits adapted from the liner notes of Tourism and Rarities.

 Original album version recorded at Nas Nevans Recording Studio, Rio de Janeiro in May 1992
 Single version remixed at EMI Studios, Stockholm in December 1992

Musicians
 Marie Fredriksson – lead and backing vocals
 Per Gessle – lead vocals, acoustic guitar, programming and mixing
 Per "Pelle" Alsing – drums
 Dave Edwards – psychedelic voice 
 Anders Herrlin – bass guitar, engineering and programming
 Jonas Isacsson – acoustic and electric guitars and mandolin
 Clarence Öfwerman – keyboards, production and mixing
 Staffan Öfwerman – backing vocals
 Alar Suurna – percussion, engineering and mixing

Technical
 Paulo Junqueiro – engineer
 Antoine Midani – assistant engineer

Charts

References

1993 singles
Roxette songs
Music videos directed by Jonas Åkerlund
Songs written by Per Gessle
1992 songs
EMI Records singles